Hans-Jürgen Veil (born 2 December 1946 in Ludwigshafen) is a German former wrestler who competed in the 1972 Summer Olympics and in the 1976 Summer Olympics.

References

External links
 

1946 births
Living people
Olympic wrestlers of West Germany
Wrestlers at the 1972 Summer Olympics
Wrestlers at the 1976 Summer Olympics
German male sport wrestlers
Olympic silver medalists for West Germany
Olympic medalists in wrestling
Medalists at the 1972 Summer Olympics
Sportspeople from Ludwigshafen
20th-century German people
21st-century German people